Granada is a town and municipality in the Colombian department of Antioquia. It is  part of the subregion of Eastern Antioquia. For More Info Amigranada

Climate
Granada has a subtropical highland climate (Cfb). It has very heavy rainfall year round.

References

Municipalities of Antioquia Department